These lists show the audio and visual recordings of L'incoronazione di Poppea by Claudio Monteverdi. The opera was premiered in Venice in 1642-43, but after a 1651 revival in Naples it remained unperformed for 250 years. It began to enter the general opera repertory in the 1960s, and thereafter was increasingly performed in leading opera houses and festivals.

Summary of recording history
The first recording of L'incoronazione, with Walter Goehr conducting the Tonhalle-Orchester Zürich in a live stage performance, was issued in 1954.  This LP version, which won a Grand Prix du Disque in 1954, is the only recording of the opera that predates the revival of the piece that began with the 1962 Glyndebourne Festival production. In 1963 Herbert von Karajan and the Vienna Staatsoper issued a version described by The Gramophone as "far from authentic", while the following year John Pritchard and the Royal Philharmonic Orchestra recorded an abridged version using Leppard's Glyndebourne orchestration. Leppard conducted a Sadler's Wells production, which was broadcast by the BBC and recorded on 27 November 1971. This is the only recording of the opera in English.

Nikolaus Harnoncourt's 1974 version, the first recording without cuts, used period instruments in an effort to achieve a more authentic sound, although Denis Arnold has criticised Harnoncourt's "over-ornamentation" of the score, particularly his use of oboe and trumpet flourishes. Arnold showed more enthusiasm for Alan Curtis's 1980 recording, live from La Fenice in Venice. Curtis uses a small band of strings, recorders and continuo, with trumpets reserved for the final coronation scene. Subsequent recordings have tended to follow the path of authenticity, with versions from baroque specialists including Richard Hickox and the City of London Baroque Sinfonia (1988), René Jacobs and Concerto Vocale (1990), and John Eliot Gardiner with the English Baroque Soloists.

In more recent years, videotape and DVD versions have proliferated. The first was in 1979, a version directed by Harnoncourt with the Zürich Opera and chorus. Leppard's second Glyndebourne production, that of 1984, was released in DVD form in 2004. Since then, productions directed by Jacobs, Christophe Rousset and Marc Minkowski have all been released on DVD, along with Emmanuelle Haïm's 2008 Glyndebourne production in which the Festival finally rejects Leppard's big-band version in favour of Haim's own small orchestra setting.

List of recordings
The lists below refer to complete performances; excerpts and highlights are excluded. The year given is the year of the recording.

Audio

Video

References
Notes

Sources

 (registration required)

Opera discographies